BHQ may refer to:

 BHQ, IATA code for Broken Hill Airport in Broken Hill, New South Wales, Australia
 Biblia Hebraica Quinta, fifth edition of the Biblia Hebraica, a scholarly version of the Old Testament
 bhq, ISO 639-3 code for the southern dialect of the Tukang Besi language, spoken in Sulawesi, Indonesia
 A type of dark quencher manufactured by  Biosearch Technologies